Samuel Clinton Hinote is a United States Air Force lieutenant general currently serving as the Deputy Chief of Staff for Air Force Futures. Prior to serving in his current position, he was the Deputy Director for Air Force Warfighting Integration Capability, Deputy Chief of Staff for Strategic Plans and Requirements.

Awards and decorations

Effective dates of promotions

References

 

 

 

 

Air University (United States Air Force) alumni
Harvard Kennedy School alumni
Living people
Recipients of the Defense Superior Service Medal
Recipients of the Legion of Merit
United States Air Force Academy alumni
United States Air Force generals
Year of birth uncertain
Year of birth missing (living people)